Destolmia lineata is a moth of the  family Notodontidae. It is found in Australia.

The larvae feed on Eucalyptus caesia.

References

Notodontidae